Ogcodes dispar is a species of small-headed flies (insects in the family Acroceridae).

References

Acroceridae
Articles created by Qbugbot
Insects described in 1855
Taxa named by Pierre-Justin-Marie Macquart
Diptera of North America